The white bullhead (Ameiurus catus), also known as the white catfish, is a member of the family Ictaluridae of the order Siluriformes.

Distribution 
The white bullhead is native to river systems of the Eastern United States from the Hudson River in New York to the Peace River in Florida and west to the Apalachicola River, Florida.  White bullheads may have migrated naturally into Connecticut rivers as a result of the white bullhead's salt tolerance.  Elsewhere, the white bullhead has been widely introduced as a food and game fish, notably into California waters as a result of intentional stocking near Stockton in 1874.  It has additionally become established in the Columbia River basin and in Puerto Rico as an introduced species.  It was reportedly introduced to the Philippines but did not become established there.  Escapees from fee-fishing ponds and stocked lakes have led to the establishment of white bullhead in Missouri.

Description 
Ameiurus catus  has a head  with eight barbels, two nasal, two maxillary and four chin. It is scaleless. It has a spine on the anterior edge of its dorsal and pectoral fins. It usually has six dorsal soft rays. It does not have palatine teeth.

Habitat 
Ameiurus catus  prefers sluggish, mud-bottom pools and backwaters of rivers and streams, and does well in lakes and large impoundments.

Behavior

Feeding 
White catfish feed mostly on the bottom, where they eat other fish and aquatic insects. They feed most actively at dusk and through the night mostly on bottom-dwelling insects, worms, amphipods, and other small invertebrates.

Reproduction 
Reproduction occurs from April to July when the water temperature ranges between 65 and 75 °F. A gelatinous mass of eggs is deposited in a cavity created by hollow logs or undercut banks. The male guards the nest and incubates the eggs by continually fanning fresh water over them.

Ecology 
Predation by introduced white bullheads contributed to the extirpation of Sacramento perch (Archoplites interruptus) from Thurston Lake by 1970.  The white bullhead commercial fishery in California was closed in 1953 due to concern of overfishing, and it is not currently considered to be an invasive species by the state.

See also
Bullhead catfish (general)

References 

white bullhead
Fish of the Eastern United States
Freshwater fish of the Southeastern United States
white bullhead
white bullhead
Freshwater fish of North America